Manuel Eduardo Berizzo Magnolo (born 13 November 1969) is an Argentine retired footballer who played as a central defender, currently manager of the Chile national team.

During his 18-year professional career he played for six teams in four countries, mainly Newell's Old Boys, River Plate and Celta. He represented Argentina in two Copa América tournaments. 

Berizzo managed in the top leagues of Argentina, Chile and Spain, leading O'Higgins to their first major honours and taking charge of three La Liga teams including Celta. He was also head coach of the national teams of Paraguay and Chile, going to two Copa América editions with the former.

Playing career

Club

Newell's and Atlas
Born in Cruz Alta, Marcos Juárez, Córdoba, Berizzo was playing in a children's league when he and friend Dario Franco were scouted for Newell's Old Boys by manager Marcelo Bielsa. He helped the team to two Primera División titles, as well as the Copa Libertadores finals of 1988 and 1992, lost to Club Nacional de Football and São Paulo FC, respectively; in the latter final, he scored the only goal of the first leg from a penalty kick, but was the first to miss in the penalty shootout that decided the tie at the Estádio do Morumbi. He was part of a trio within the team known as Los tres chiflados ("The Three Stooges"), taking the role of Moe alongside Julio Saldaña (Larry) and Alfredo Berti (Curly).

In 1993, as Newell's sought to renew their team and transfers to Sporting de Gijón and Udinese Calcio in Europe did not materialise, Berizzo signed for Mexico's Club Atlas under Bielsa. Arriving with a knee injury, he adapted to the country's heat and altitude and became captain. After three seasons that he described as "not good but excellent", he was about to sign a five-year contract extension when an offer came through from Club Atlético River Plate in his country; club president Francisco Ibarra retired his number 2 jersey for the rest of his term.

River Plate and Marseille
At River, Berizzo played in central defence alongside Paraguayan Celso Ayala in a team that won three consecutive league tournaments and the 1997 Supercopa Libertadores. His solid performances eventually attracted the attention of French club Olympique de Marseille, who signed him in July 1999 on a three-year deal for a fee of 20 million francs (€3 million) to replace 1998 FIFA World Cup winner Laurent Blanc. After a 5–1 loss at AS Saint-Étienne on 11 December, he argued with new manager Bernard Casoni; unsettled and out of form, he was loaned to his former team in January 2000.

Known initially as "Totito", Berizzo inherited the nickname "Toto" from his father, who died in a car accident in March 2000 after watching him play for River against Club Universidad de Chile in the Libertadores. He won another Clausura tournament that year.

Celta
Berizzo moved to Spain with RC Celta de Vigo, in another winter transfer move. He was an important defensive unit for the Galicians, contributing 17 La Liga matches in his first year as they finished in sixth position; in a run to the final of the Copa del Rey, he scored in each leg of a 4–2 aggregate win over FC Barcelona in the semi-finals in June 2001, the second at the Camp Nou being Pep Guardiola's farewell for the hosts. In his second full season he registered career-bests (at Celta) 27 games with two goals, helping the side to reach the UEFA Champions League for the first time ever.

In the 2003–04 campaign, Berizzo was sent off four times, twice in the last two rounds, as Celta eventually dropped down a level. He also made five appearances in a round-of-16 run in European competition, eventually losing his importance and being released in June 2005 at nearly 36.

Berizzo stayed in Spain and signed a one-year contract with Cádiz CF, appearing scarcely and suffering another top-flight relegation. He retired at the end of the season.

The bearer of an Italian passport, Berizzo did not occupy a non-European Union spot while competing in the continent.

International
Having played for the under-23 team that missed out in qualification for the 1992 Olympic tournament, Berizzo made his debut for Argentina in the 1998 FIFA World Cup qualifying stage against Venezuela, on 9 October 1996. He was picked up for the squads for the 1997 Copa América – only playing in the quarter-final loss to Peru and being sent off after two yellow cards– and the 1999 Copa América, where he was not used.

Berizzo's last international took place on 15 November 2000, in the 2002 World Cup qualifier against Chile, appearing seven minutes in a 2–0 away win. He broke his ankle in February 2002, completely ruling him out of the final stages in South Korea and Japan.

Coaching career

Early years
When Bielsa took over as Chile manager in July 2007, Berizzo became assistant manager. On 10 October 2009, in a World Cup qualifier against Colombia (4–2 away victory), he was ejected alongside Fabián Orellana and eventually received a four-match ban, not being present on the bench for the entirety of the final stages in South Africa.

On 7 February 2011, Berizzo was hired in his own right at Argentine defending champions Estudiantes de La Plata, after the resignation of Alejandro Sabella. His first game four days later was a 2–1 home win over his former club, Newell's. He resigned on 30 May after a poor run of form, including elimination from the Copa Libertadores by Paraguay's Cerro Porteño in the last 16.

O'Higgins

Berizzo signed a two-year deal with O'Higgins F.C. of the Chilean Primera División on 2 December 2011. He achieved runner-up honours in his debut season, losing the final against Club Universidad de Chile in a penalty shootout. 

On 10 December 2013, Berizzo led the team from Rancagua to the 2013 Apertura, the first title in their 58-year history. The following 3 May, they won the Supercopa de Chile against Deportes Iquique, again on penalties; he had already agreed that this would be his last game.

La Liga
On 19 May 2014, Berizzo returned to Celta but as a manager, replacing FC Barcelona-bound Luis Enrique on a two-year deal. In his third, he coached the side to the last-four stage in both the Copa del Rey and the UEFA Europa League.

Berizzo was confirmed as the new manager of Sevilla FC on 27 May 2017, replacing countryman Jorge Sampaoli who accepted the Argentina job. On 22 November, it was announced he had been diagnosed with prostate cancer; a month later, he was fired due to a poor run of results. Much of his short time at the club was recorded in the Amazon Prime television documentary series Six Dreams, in which he was one of its stars.

Berizzo returned to active on 31 May 2018, being appointed at Athletic Bilbao. After winning only two of his 15 competitive matches in charge and with the team in the relegation zone, he was dismissed.

Paraguay
On 18 February 2019, Berizzo was named Paraguay's new coach after Juan Carlos Osorio's resignation. At the year's Copa América in Brazil, he led the team to the quarter-finals where they were eliminated on penalties after a goalless draw with the hosts. Two years later, the national side fell at the same stage on the same method against Peru.

Berizzo was relieved of his duties on 15 October 2021, following a 4–0 loss in Bolivia in the World Cup qualifiers.

Chile
Berizzo was hired on a four-year contract to be the manager of Chile on 26 May 2022, after the dismissal of Martín Lasarte for failing to reach the World Cup. His first game on 6 June was a 2–0 friendly loss away to South Korea; this was followed by defeats to Tunisia and Ghana at the Kirin Cup in Japan.

Remarks on homosexuality
Shortly after leaving Marseille, Berizzo spoke out against alleged homosexuality in France:
	

The day after that quote was published by Mexican newspaper La Crónica de Hoy, he denied having said that:

Managerial statistics

Honours

Player
Newell's
Argentine Primera División: 1990–91, Clausura 1992

River Plate
Argentine Primera División: Clausura 1997, Apertura 1997, Clausura 2000
Supercopa Libertadores: 1997

Manager
O'Higgins
Primera División de Chile: Apertura 2013
Supercopa de Chile: 2014

Notes

References

External links

1969 births
Living people
Argentine people of Italian descent
Citizens of Italy through descent
Sportspeople from Córdoba Province, Argentina
Argentine footballers
Association football defenders
Argentine Primera División players
Newell's Old Boys footballers
Club Atlético River Plate footballers
Liga MX players
Atlas F.C. footballers
Ligue 1 players
Olympique de Marseille players
La Liga players
Segunda División players
RC Celta de Vigo players
Cádiz CF players
Argentina international footballers
1997 Copa América players
1999 Copa América players
Argentine expatriate footballers
Expatriate footballers in Mexico
Expatriate footballers in France
Expatriate footballers in Spain
Argentine expatriate sportspeople in Mexico
Argentine expatriate sportspeople in France
Argentine expatriate sportspeople in Spain
Argentine football managers
Argentine Primera División managers
Estudiantes de La Plata managers
Chilean Primera División managers
O'Higgins F.C. managers
La Liga managers
RC Celta de Vigo managers
Sevilla FC managers
Athletic Bilbao managers
Paraguay national football team managers
Chile national football team managers
2019 Copa América managers
2021 Copa América managers
Argentine expatriate football managers
Expatriate football managers in Chile
Expatriate football managers in Spain
Expatriate football managers in Paraguay
Argentine expatriate sportspeople in Chile
Argentine expatriate sportspeople in Paraguay